Takayoshi Eguchi (江口 孝義; Eguchi Takayoshi, born May 15, 1969) is a former baseball player from Japan.  He later played in the Pacific League for the Fukuoka Daiei Hawks .

References

Japanese baseball players
1969 births
Living people
Nippon Professional Baseball pitchers
Fukuoka Daiei Hawks players